Gianangelo Barzan (24 November 1901 – 2 December 1983) was an Italian footballer who played as a midfielder.

Career
Born in Adria, Barzan began his career with Petrarca Padova, and later played for Padova and Milan, where he served as his team's captain between 1926 and 1927. He later also played for two seasons (27 games, 20 goals) in the Italian Serie A for A.S. Roma and A.S. Bari.

1901 births
1983 deaths
Italian footballers
Association football midfielders
Serie A players
Calcio Padova players
A.C. Milan players
A.S. Roma players
S.S.C. Bari players